Nancy Woloch (born 1940) is an American historian. Her book A Class by Herself: Protective Laws for Women Workers, 1890s-1990s won the 2016 Philip Taft Labor History Book Award and the William G. Bowen Award for the Outstanding Book on Labor and Public Policy.

Woloch is an adjunct professor at Barnard College and  Columbia University, where she specialises in women's history and the history of education.

Woloch has a BA from Wellesley College, an MA from Columbia University and a PhD from Indiana University.

In 2016 Time chose Woloch as one of 25 historians asked to nominate a "Moment that changed America", and she contributed "FDR Signs the Fair Labor Standards Act (June 25, 1938)".

Selected publications
A Class by Herself: Protective Laws for Women Workers, 1890s-1990s (2015, Princeton UP)
Women and the American Experience (Knopf, 1984; 5th ed. McGraw Hill, 2011 )
The American Century: A History of the United States Since the 1890s, with Walter La Feber and Richard Polenberg (7th ed., 2013)
Early American Women: A Documentary History, 1600-1900 (2nd ed., 1997)
Muller v. Oregon: A Brief History with Documents (1996, Bedford Books of St. Martin's Press)

References

External links

1940 births
Living people
American women historians
Wellesley College alumni
Columbia University alumni
Indiana University alumni
21st-century American historians
American historians of education
Women's historians
21st-century American women writers
Historians from Indiana